Steinbrecher (from  "stone" plus Brecher "breaker") is a German language occupational surname for a person who worked in a stone quarry. Notable people with the name include:

  (1910–1982), Austrian composer
 Edwin Charles Steinbrecher (1930–2002), American astrologer
 Hank Steinbrecher (born 1947), American former soccer executive, player, and coach
 Helmut Steinbrecher (1896–unknown), German World War I pilot
 Jon Steinbrecher, American sports official
 Marianne Steinbrecher (born 1983), Brazilian volleyball player
  (born 1965), German television presenter and journalist

See also

References 

German-language surnames
Occupational surnames